is a professional Japanese baseball player. He plays catcher for the Tokyo Yakult Swallows.

Uchiyama hit a three-run home run to tie Game 2 of the 2022 Japan Series.

References

External links

2002 births
Living people
Baseball people from Toyama Prefecture
Japanese baseball players
Nippon Professional Baseball catchers
Tokyo Yakult Swallows players